TekWar is a North American television series, based on the TekWar novels written by William Shatner, and developed for television by Stephen Roloff. The series followed Jake Cardigan, a former police officer turned private investigator working for Cosmos, a private security firm owned and operated by Walter Bascom.

Series overview
{| class="wikitable" style="text-align: center;"
|-
! colspan="2" rowspan="2"| Season
!! rowspan="2"| Episodes
!! colspan="2"| Originally aired
!! colspan="4"| DVD release date
|-
! Season premiere
! Season finale
! Region 1 (US)
! Region 1 (CAN)
! Region 2
! Region 4
|-
| style="background:#B60000; color:#100; text-align:center;"|
| 1 
|4
|
|
|
|
|
|
|-
| style="background:#082567; color:#100; text-align:center;"|
| 2 
|18
|
|
|
|
|
|
|}

Episodes

Season 1 (1994)

Season 2 (1994–1996)

References

External links

Season 1

Season 2

Tekwar episodes
Tekwar episodes